Frizzle chicken may refer to:

 Frizzle (chicken plumage), a curled-feather type of chicken plumage common to certain breeds of domestic chicken
 Frizzle chicken (breed), a specific breed of domestic chicken with this feature